Rușețu is a commune in Buzău County, Muntenia, Romania. It is composed of two villages, Rușețu and Sergent Ionel Ștefan.

Notes

Communes in Buzău County
Localities in Muntenia